Mount Mullen is a double-peaked mountain  east-southeast of Mount Milton in the south Sentinel Range of the Ellsworth Mountains, Antarctica.

The feature was named by US-ACAN in 2006, after Roy R. Mullen, a former employee of the USGS (1960–95, associate chief of the National Mapping Division with responsibility for Antarctic activities 1980–95, USGS representative to SCAR).

See also
 Mountains in Antarctica

Maps
 Vinson Massif.  Scale 1:250 000 topographic map.  Reston, Virginia: US Geological Survey, 1988.
 Antarctic Digital Database (ADD). Scale 1:250000 topographic map of Antarctica. Scientific Committee on Antarctic Research (SCAR). Since 1993, regularly updated.

References
 Mount Mullen. SCAR Composite Antarctic Gazetteer.

Ellsworth Mountains
Mountains of Ellsworth Land